Hibbertia pholidota is a species of flowering plant in the family Dilleniaceae and is endemic to a restricted area of Queensland. It is a spreading to scrambling shrub with scaly foliage, oblong leaves and yellow flowers with 30 to 36 stamens arranged around two densely scaly carpels.

Description
Flowering has been observed in November and January.

Taxonomy
Hibbertia pholidota was first formally described in 1991 by Sally T. Reynolds in the journal Austrobaileya from specimens collected on Hinchinbrook Island in 1977. The specific epithet (pholidota) means "scaly".

Distribution and habitat
This hibbertia grows in sandy soil, often near rocks and usually along creeks on Hitchinbrook Island and along the nearby coast in northern Queensland.

Conservation status
Hibbertia pholidota is classified as of "least concern" under the Queensland Government Nature Conservation Act 1992.

See also
List of Hibbertia species

References

pholidota
Flora of Queensland
Plants described in 1991
Taxa named by Sally T. Reynolds